Boiry-Notre-Dame is a commune in the Pas-de-Calais department in the Hauts-de-France region in northern France.

Geography
Boiry-Notre-Dame is a farming village located 10 miles (16 km) southeast of Arras on the D34 road.

Population

Sights
 The church of St. Vaast, rebuilt after the destruction of the village during World War I.

See also
Communes of the Pas-de-Calais department

References

Communes of Pas-de-Calais